Hamnett is a station on the East Busway, located in Wilkinsburg and near Edgewood.

There is a park and ride lot close to the station.

References

Bus rapid transit in Pennsylvania
Busways
Port Authority of Allegheny County
Transportation in Pennsylvania
Martin Luther King Jr. East Busway